Kartik Aaryan Tiwari (born 22 November 1990), is an Indian actor who works in Hindi films. After pursuing a degree in engineering, he made his acting debut with Luv Ranjan's buddy film Pyaar Ka Punchnama (2011). He went on to star in the romances Akaash Vani (2013) and Kaanchi (2014), but these failed to propel his career forward.

Aaryan had commercial successes in Ranjan's comedies Pyaar Ka Punchnama 2 (2015) and Sonu Ke Titu Ki Sweety (2018), with the latter emerging as his breakthrough film. He gained further prominence by starring in the romantic comedies Luka Chuppi and Pati Patni Aur Woh (both 2019), and the comedy horror film Bhool Bhulaiyaa 2 (2022). The last of these emerged as his highest-grossing release. He also played against type in the thrillers Dhamaka (2021) and Freddy (2022).

In addition to his acting career, Aaryan endorses several brands and products, and has co-hosted award ceremonies. He appeared in Forbes India Celebrity 100 list of 2019.

Life and career

Early life and work (1990–2017) 
Kartik Tiwari (later Aaryan) was born on 22 November 1990 in Gwalior, Madhya Pradesh. Both his parents are doctors; his father, Dr. Manish Tiwari, is a paediatrician, and his mother, Dr. Mala Tiwari, is a gynaecologist. He pursued an engineering degree in biotechnology from Navi Mumbai's  D. Y. Patil College of Engineering, Navi Mumbai, while secretly harbouring ambitions for a career in film. He has said that he would skip his classes and travel for two hours to attend auditions. Aaryan began a modelling career while in university and after three years of unsuccessfully auditioning for films, he did an acting course from the Kreating Charakters institute. He informed his parents of his desire to become an actor only after he signed his first film.

While still in his third year of college, Aaryan made his acting debut with Luv Ranjan's buddy film Pyaar Ka Punchnama (2011), co-starring Divyendu Sharma, Raayo S Bakhirta, and Nushrat Bharucha, which revolves around the romantic tribulations faced by three young men. He found a casting call for the film on Facebook and secured the role after auditioning for six months. As he had limited financial means at that point, he lived in an apartment with 12 other aspiring actors and earned money by cooking for them. In Pyaar Ka Punchnama, his character's four-minute monologue was one of the lengthiest single shots done for a Hindi film to that point. Reviewing it for Rediff.com, Shaikh Ayaz found Aaryan's "bursting soliloquy on why women are the way they are and can never be understood [to be] riotously funny". Namrata Joshi of Outlook criticised the film for portraying each of the female characters as a "hard-hearted bitch" but was appreciative of Aaryan's monologue and the chemistry between the three men. The film emerged as a sleeper hit and he received a nomination for the Producers Guild Film Award for Best Male Debut.

After the release of Pyaar Ka Punchnama, Aaryan completed his engineering degree on the insistence of his mother. His next film release came two years later when he collaborated once again with Ranjan and Bharucha in the romance Akaash Vani (2013), which is about the titular lovers who are separated when Vani is married off to an abusive husband. Sudhish Kamath of The Hindu praised the film for exploring chauvinism in India, a rare concept for Hindi film, and praised the chemistry between the two stars, writing that "you can tell how much they are in love, even when they don't have any lines". Sudhir Chaudhary, the cinematographer in Aaryan's previous films, showed his work to Subhash Ghai, who was impressed by Aaryan and cast him in his directorial Kaanchi (2014). It is a drama about a woman's quest for justice when her husband is murdered by politicians, in which Aaryan played the love interest of the title character (played by Mishti). Despite a brief role, Aaryan agreed to the project to work with Ghai. Saibal Chatterjee of NDTV disliked the film but wrote that Aaryan "exudes strong screen presence and shows flashes of qualities needed to be a mainstream Bollywood lover boy". Both Akaash Vani and Kaanchi did not perform well commercially, leading Aaryan to question his career prospects.

In 2015, Aaryan starred in Ranjan's comedy sequel Pyaar Ka Punchnama 2, which retained some of the original's cast, including him and Bharucha, and added the actors Omkar Kapoor and Sunny Singh. In it, he delivered an even longer, seven minute single-shot monologue. Mike McCahill of The Guardian criticised the film's poor handling of female roles, but considered the banter between Aaryan and Bharucha's characters to be its highlight. Shubha Shetty-Guha of Mid-Day too took note of the misogynistic themes but found parts of it "uproariously funny". When asked about the sexism in the film, Aaryan said that as a proponent of gender equality his character did not reflect his personal beliefs. For his performance, Aaryan won a Stardust Award for Best Actor In A Comic Role.

The following year, Aaryan featured as a young Muslim boy who falls in love with an older woman in Tanuja Chandra's short film Silvat, which was made as part of the Zeal For Unity initiative to bridge cultural barriers between India and Pakistan. As he enjoyed working in comedies, Aaryan next starred alongside Paresh Rawal and Kriti Kharbanda in Guest iin London (2017), which is about a young couple troubled by unwelcome guests. A few scenes between Rawal and him were improvised on set. In a scathing review, Rohit Vats of Hindustan Times criticised the film's reliance on flatulence humour, and wrote that Aaryan "looks good, dances well, does his gags well, but eventually ends up playing the second fiddle to Rawal. Kartik has a likeable vibe, but that gets drowned in Rawal’s perennial farting." It did not perform well commercially.

Breakthrough and commercial success (2018–present) 
Aaryan's breakthrough came in 2018 when he collaborated with Ranjan and Bharucha for the fourth time in Sonu Ke Titu Ki Sweety, which also reunited him with Singh. The film tells the story of Sonu (Aaryan) who plots to separate his best friend Titu (Singh) from his fiancée Sweety (Bharucha) as Sonu considers her to be a gold digger. As with the Pyaar Ka Punchnama films, reviewers criticised the film's misogyny; Anna M. M. Vetticad of Firstpost took note of the film's homosexual undertones but panned it as a "dreary woman-hate-fest" and thought that Aaryan was "tiresome and hammy" in it. Rajeev Masand too disliked the "objectionable stereotyping" of women but found it to be "unquestionably funny" and credited Aaryan for making his character a "relatable, likeable figure despite his misdeeds". Once again addressing the criticisms, Aaryan said that portraying women as negative characters did not amount to misogyny just as casting men in villainous roles did not amount to misandry. He won the Zee Cine Award for Best Actor in a Comic Role.

Aaryan believed that the success of Sonu Ke Titu Ki Sweety allowed him to choose from a wider variety of roles. He was drawn to Luka Chuppi (2019), a satire on live-in relationships in small-town India, for depicting social issues through comedy. Co-starring Kriti Sanon, it was filmed in his hometown of Gwalior. Shubhra Gupta of The Indian Express criticised the writing for failing to subvert the issues raised in the film, and thought that both Aaryan and Sanon "come off standard-issue Bollywood". He next starred alongside Bhumi Pednekar and Ananya Panday in the comedy Pati Patni Aur Woh, a remake of the 1978 film of the same name. He took on the part of a philandering husband, which was played by Sanjeev Kumar in the original film. Anupama Chopra considered the film to be less misogynistic than the original; she wrote that Aaryan "enthusiastically commits" to his part but added that he had been overshadowed by his leading ladies. Both Luka Chuppi and Pati Patni Aur Woh were commercially successful, each grossing over  worldwide. For the latter, he won his second consecutive Zee Cine Award for Best Actor in a Comic Role.

Imtiaz Ali's romantic drama Love Aaj Kal, a spiritual successor to Ali's 2009 film of the same name was Aaryan's sole film release of 2020. He played dual roles of young men in 1990 and 2020, opposite Arushi Sharma and Sara Ali Khan, respectively, after working on the mannerisms and body language of the characters to differentiate them from each other. In a negative review of the film, Nandini Ramnath of Scroll.in wrote that Aaryan "nails the diffidence and callowness of his characters" but bemoaned that he lacked "brooding quality and simmering intensity" in certain scenes. It emerged as a box office bomb.

Aaryan was cast by Dharma Productions in the comedy sequel Dostana 2, but after filming for 20 days, he was fired. Bollywood Hungama reported that it was due to creative differences between him and producer Karan Johar, and that the production company would not work with Aaryan in the future. In 2021, Aaryan starred in Ram Madhvani's thriller Dhamaka, a remake of the Korean film The Terror Live (2013). Filmed entirely in 10 days, it was released on Netflix. Stutee Ghosh of The Quint believed Aaryan's dark, against-type performance to be among the film's positive aspects. 

The following year, Aaryan starred in Anees Bazmee's horror comedy Bhool Bhulaiyaa 2 with Tabu and Kiara Advani. He temporarily lost his voice while filming its climax sequence. In a mixed review, Shalini Langer of The Indian Express noted that Aaryan's "cockiness [and] enthusiasm... lends some much-needed energy to the film". He next played the titular role of a socially awkward dentist with a dark past in the psychological thriller Freddy, which released on Disney+ Hotstar. In preparation, he gained 14kgs, observed a dentist at work, and lived in isolation. Reviewers for India Today and Hindustan Times were appreciative of Aaryan for playing against his comic and romantic image.

In 2023, Aaryan starred in a remake of the Telugu action film Ala Vaikunthapurramuloo (2020), titled Shehzada. When the film's producers suffered a financial crisis, Aaryan returned his salary, and was thus credited as producer. The film was a critical and commercial failure. He will next reunite with Kiara Advani in the romantic drama Satyaprem Ki Katha.

Other work and media image 
In addition to acting in films, Aaryan endorses several brands and products, including the sportswear brand Hummel International, the cream Emami Fair And Handsome and the clothing brand Manyavar. He has also co-hosted the 2018 IIFA Awards with Ayushmann Khurrana, and the 2019 Zee Cine Awards with Vicky Kaushal.

In 2016, Aaryan became a member of the All Stars Football Club, which organises football matches for charity. He participated with several other celebrities, including Ranbir Kapoor, for a tournament held in New Delhi the following year. Aaryan was scheduled to take part in the club's next tournament, held in Singapore in 2018, but had to back out after dislocating his toe during practice. In 2018, Aaryan raised awareness on plastic pollution during World Environment Day. The following year, the Election Commission of India appointed him to raise awareness on voter participation in his home state of Madhya Pradesh.

Aaryan was placed eighth in The Times of Indias listing of the country's most desirable men of 2018. In 2021, he ranked 20th in Duff & Phelps's listing of the country's most valuable celebrity brands.

Filmography

Films

Television

Music videos

Awards and nominations

Film awards and nominations

Other awards and recognition

Notes

References

External links 

 
 
 

1990 births
Indian male film actors
Living people
Male actors from Madhya Pradesh
Male actors in Hindi cinema
Indian film actors
21st-century Indian male actors
People from Gwalior
Zee Cine Awards winners